Lower Two Medicine Lake is located partly in Glacier National Park as well as on the Blackfeet Indian Reservation, in the U. S. state of Montana.

The lake is natural but has a small dam which regulates the lake level and reduces the potential for downstream flooding.  Lower Two Medicine Dam is an earthen structure built in 1967 for flood control and irrigation storage, impounding a maximum capacity of 25,120 acre-feet.  The dam and reservoir are owned and operated by the Bureau of Indian Affairs.

Because the lake lies partially on the Blackfeet Indian Reservation, a permit is necessary to fish in the eastern half of the lake.

See also
List of lakes in Glacier County, Montana

References

Lakes of Glacier National Park (U.S.)
Lakes of Glacier County, Montana